Marion is an unincorporated community in Marion Township, Olmsted County, Minnesota, United States.

History
Marion was founded either in 1855 or 1856. A post office was established at Marion in 1857, and remained in operation until 1905.

References

Unincorporated communities in Olmsted County, Minnesota
Unincorporated communities in Minnesota